Sandra Lach Arlinghaus is an American educator who is adjunct professor in the School of Natural Resources and Environment at the University of Michigan. Her research concerns mathematical geography.

Education
Arlinghaus has an A.B. in Mathematics from Vassar College, an MA in geography from Wayne State University, and a PhD in Theoretical Geography from the University of Michigan.

Books
Arlinghaus is the author or co-author of several books on mathematical geography, including:
 Spatial Mathematics: Theory and Practice through Mapping, with Joseph Kerski (CRC Press, 2013)
 Graph Theory and Geography:  An Interactive View, eBook, with William C. Arlinghaus and Frank Harary (Wiley, 2002)
 Practical Handbook of Spatial Statistics, with Daniel A. Griffith (CRC Press, 1995)
 Practical Handbook of Digital Mapping:  Terms and Concepts, with Robert F. Austin (CRC Press, 1994)
 Practical Handbook of Curve Fitting (CRC Press, 1994)

References

Year of birth missing (living people)
Living people
Vassar College alumni
Wayne State University alumni
University of Michigan College of Literature, Science, and the Arts alumni
University of Michigan faculty